Nothing Is Easy: Live at the Isle of Wight 1970 is a live album by Jethro Tull, released on 2 November 2004. It was recorded on the fifth and last day of the Isle of Wight Festival 1970, where Jethro Tull were second on the bill between The Moody Blues and Jimi Hendrix.

Track listing
 "My Sunday Feeling" – 5:22
 "My God" – 7:33 (with flute solo)
 "With You There to Help Me" – 10:00 (with piano solo (By kind permission of...)
 "To Cry You a Song" – 5:42
 "Bourée" (instrumental) – 4:36
 "Dharma for One" – (Ian Anderson, Clive Bunker) 10:10 (with drum solo)
 "Nothing Is Easy" – 5:38
 "We Used to Know / For a Thousand Mothers" – 10:37 (with guitar solo between both tracks)

Personnel 
Jethro Tull
 Ian Anderson – acoustic guitar, flute, vocals
 Glenn Cornick – bass
 Clive Bunker – drums
 Martin Barre – guitars
 John Evan – keyboards

DVD 

Like Living with the Past, this album is both a CD and a DVD.
The DVD was released 22 March 2005, and contains many of same songs as the CD.

 "Bourée" (from the soundcheck)
 "My Sunday Feeling" – 4:52
 "A Song for Jeffrey" – 2:44 (from The Rolling Stones Rock and Roll Circus in 1968)
 "My God" – 9:47
 "Dharma for One" – 14:51 (full-length version)
 "Nothing Is Easy" – 5:48
 "We Used to Know / For a Thousand Mothers" – 8:52 (with guitar solo between both tracks)

"With You There to Help Me" and "To Cry You a Song" have not been included, and the "We Used to Know / For a Thousand Mothers" medley has been shortened. Instead, it includes the complete full-length version of "Dharma for One" and "My God".

See also 
 Isle of Wight Festival 1970
 Living with the Past
 Message to Love

References

External links 
  (CD)
  (CD+DVD)
 Nothing is Easy at Allmovie (DVD)
 Nothing is Easy at Progressive World

2004 video albums
Jethro Tull (band) live albums
Jethro Tull (band) video albums
Live video albums
2004 live albums
Films directed by Murray Lerner
2000s English-language films